Neil Gilbert Siegel (born February 19, 1954) is an American computer scientist, systems engineer, and engineer, known for his development of many key systems for the United States military, including the Blue-Force Tracking system, the U.S. Army's first unmanned air vehicle system, and the US Army forward-area air defense system.  Several of his inventions also found their way into consumer products, such as hand-held devices (e.g., mobile GPS devices, smartphones, etc.) whose map displays automatically orient themselves to align with the real-world's cardinal points.

Early life and work 
Siegel was born in Brooklyn, New York, to Bernard Siegel and Judith Love Cohen, and has lived most of his life in the area southwest of Los Angeles. He has two full siblings, Howard and Rachel, and is an older half-brother of actor Jack Black. He attended the University of Southern California, earning degrees in mathematics.  During and after this time, he worked as a professional musician, mostly performing on the flute, and also playing folk and art music from the Balkans and the Middle East. Later, he earned a Ph.D. in systems engineering (also from USC), where his Ph.D. advisor was noted computer scientist Barry Boehm. Both of his parents were born Jewish.

In 1976, he began work at what was then TRW (acquired by Northrop Grumman in 2002).

Career 
Starting in 1993, he led an organization at TRW that developed one-of-a-kind automation systems for the US military and (to a lesser extent) commercial companies.  This organization achieved significant business success, growing rapidly every year during his tenure as leader (which continued until 2001).  They created many new products whose general theme was automation support to decision-makers who operate in complex and stressful environments.  In addition to the US Army and the US Air Force, customers during this time included the US steel industry and the movie industry.

In 1993, his team fielded the US Army's first fully automated command-and-control system, the Forward-Area Air Defense C2 System.  This system is still in use today.

In 1995, his team won the contract to develop the US Army's first "digital battlefield" system, called Force-XXI Battle Command Brigade and Below (generally known by the acronym FBCB2).  This has resulted in a highly regarded capability for the US, now used by the Marine Corps, as well as the Army.

Also in 1995, his team delivered the US Army's first automated command post, which has been followed by a long series of related capabilities to the present time.

In 1997, he was given responsibility for "fixing" the Hunter UAV program, the US Army's first unmanned air vehicle.  The program had suffered a series of crashes during testing, and was nominally "cancelled".  During his tenure, the program became one of the US' most reliable unmanned air vehicles.  The Hunter entered operational service in 1999 in the Balkans.  UAVs were unreliable novelties in 1997, but by the time he retired in 2015, UAVs were in widespread use in both military and civilian settings.

His personal science and engineering contributions have centered on techniques for ultra-low bandwidth intra-network routing and achieving acceptable dynamics through what he calls "force-structure-aware" networks. He has been a pioneer in large-scale deployments of GPS-enabled applications (like the Blue-Force Tracking system).  He has also been active in the field of structuring large-scale software developments so as to match the skill distribution encountered in real-world teams.

Since mid-2001, he has been the chief technology officer of TRW's Systems (now Northrop Grumman Mission Systems, and later, Northrop Grumman Mission Systems).  Prior to his tenure as VP / CTO, he served as VP / general manager of the Tactical Systems Division. 

His work during this time has extended his earlier work in military networks, force-structure-aware networks, and large-scale system engineering methodologies.  He retired at the end of 2015.  He served as a VP and officer of the company for nearly 18 years.

As of 2016, Siegel became the IBM Professor of Engineering Management at USC.  He is also an Adjunct Professor of Engineering at UCLA. Additionally, Siegel also teaches undergraduate engineering classes.

Awards and honors 
Siegel has received a number of awards and honors, including:

 Election to the US National Academy of Engineering in 2005.
 Selection as an IEEE Fellow (2011).
 The IEEE Simon Ramo Medal (2011), for systems engineering and systems science.
 Member (2017) and Fellow (2019), National Academy of Inventors.
 US Army Honorable Order of Saint Barbara, 1996.
 iCMG award for system architecture (2011)
 Northern Virginia Technology Council—CTO of the year award (2011)

Consumer electronics, and the first wireless internet 
Siegel has had a major impact on the design and capabilities of many types of mobile consumer electronics, including smart phones, GPS receivers, and so forth.  He is the documented earliest creator of a complete, operating adaptation of the internet to fully-routed wireless operation, and many important / related technologies that are widely used today in such wireless devices, including:

 GPS-enabled mobile devices
 Automatic orientation of a map display to match the geographic cardinal points
 Optimizing unicast protocols (including TCP) for use on low-bandwidth, wireless networks
 Performing many security administrative and control tasks remotely
 Managing and administering a large network of wireless devices
 Increasing battery life on GPS-enabled devices

Personal life
Siegel is an experienced musician who plays the flute, târ, ney, and kaval who has more than 1,500 concerts to his credit worldwide.  He studied music with Iranian Sufi master Morteza Varzi for more than 20 years.  He is a long-time member of Professional Musicians Local 47, American Federation of Musicians, AFL-CIO.

He is married to Robyn Friend, a writer, dancer, and singer, with whom he has performed all over the world during the last 30 years.

He is on the board of several non-profit organizations, including the Providence Trinity Health Care Hospice Foundation, the Electric Infrastructure Security Council, and The Institute of Persian Performing Arts.  Since 2013, he and his wife, Robyn, have operated their own charitable organization, The Siegel and Friend Foundation.

References

External links
A more-complete list of his awards

Living people
1954 births
American computer scientists
Members of the United States National Academy of Engineering
People from Brooklyn
Fellow Members of the IEEE
Jewish American scientists
Tar lute players
Ney players
21st-century American Jews